Pongpol Adireksarn (pen name Paul Adirex; born March 23, 1942) is a Thai novelist and former politician.

Life 
Pongpol's father, Pramarn Adireksarn, was a Major-General of the Royal Thai Army who became a politician and co-founder of the conservative Thai Nation Party in 1973. His mother Charoen Adireksarn (née Choonhavan) was a sister of Chatichai Choonhavan, Thailand's prime minister from 1988 to 1991. Pongpol's maternal grandfather Field Marshal Phin Choonhavan was the leader of the 1947 coup d'état and commander-in-chief of the Thai army from 1948 to 1954. One of his aunts was married to police general Phao Sriyanond who was part of a "triumvirate" that effectively ruled Thailand from 1952 to 1957. Pongpol is thus a scion of the powerful "Soi Rajakru clan". His brother Yongyol Adireksarn was also a politician.

After attending the Catholic Saint Gabriel's College in Bangkok, Pongpol went to study in the United States, receiving a BA from Lehigh University in 1964, and an MA from the American University in 1966. Upon returning to Thailand, he took a position at the Department of Economic Relations, Ministry of Economic Affairs, followed by a position in the Thai Department of Central Intelligence.

After the 1973 popular uprising, Pongpol worked in the private sector with such positions as managing director of Royal Mosaic Exports Co., Ltd., president of Thailand Leatherwork Co., Ltd., and president of Express Transport Organization.

As a member of his father's Thai Nation Party, Pongpol was a member of parliament, representing Saraburi Province from 1983 to 1986 and March to June 1992. From April to June 1992 he also served as Minister of Foreign Affairs in Suchinda Kraprayoon's government. He served again as member of parliament from 1995 to 2000. He was Minister to the Office of the Prime Minister under his party colleague Banharn Silpa-archa from 1995 to 1996, and Minister of Agriculture and Cooperatives under Chuan Leekpai from 1997 to 2000.

Then he switched to the Thai Rak Thai Party (TRT) of Thaksin Shinawatra under whose premiership he served as Deputy Prime Minister and Minister of Education from 2001 to 2003. After the 2006 coup d'état, the Constitutional tribunal dissolved the TRT party and banned all of its leading members, including Pongpol Adireksarn, from political offices for five years.

Royal decorations

  Knight Grand Cross (First Class) of the Most Noble Order of the Crown of Thailand
  Knight Grand Cross (First Class) of the Most Exalted Order of the White Elephant
  Knight Grand Cordon (Special Class) of The Most Noble Order of the Crown of Thailand
  Knight Grand Cordon (Special Class) of the Most Exalted Order of the White Elephant

Writing career
After losing the 1992 election and being out of politics temporarily, he started writing novels. He chose to use a pen name as he considered his Thai name to be to difficult for a foreign readership.
The Pirates of Tarutao, 1994, 
Mekong, 1995, 
Until the Karma Ends, 1996, 
The King Kong Effect, 1998, 
Rattanakosin, 2005, 
Chameleon Man, 2006,

References

Pongpol Adireksarn
Pongpol Adireksarn
Pongpol Adireksarn
1942 births
Living people
Pongpol Adireksarn
Pongpol Adireksarn
Pongpol Adireksarn
Adireksarn, Pongol
Pongpol Adireksarn
Pongpol Adireksarn
20th-century novelists
21st-century novelists
Pongpol Adireksarn
Pongpol Adireksarn
20th-century male writers
21st-century male writers
Pongpol Adireksarn
Pongpol Adireksarn